Norman Rudolph Prahl (July 20, 1919 – June 7, 1996) was an American politician.

Prahl was born in Vivian, South Dakota. He lived in Grand Rapids, Minnesota his wife and family. Prahl was involved with farming, ranching, and mining. Prahl served as a Minnesota township supervisor. He also served in the Minnesota House of Representatives from 1971 to 1980 and was a Democrat. He died at the Itasca Medical Center in Grand Rapids Minnesota.

References

1919 births
1996 deaths
People from Grand Rapids, Minnesota
People from Lyman County, South Dakota
Farmers from Minnesota
Democratic Party members of the Minnesota House of Representatives